82 Cancri is a solitary, orange-hued star in the zodiac constellation of Cancer. It has the Bayer designation Pi2 Cancri, which is Latinized from π2 Cancri; 82 Cancri is the star's Flamsteed designation. The star lies just a degree to the south of the ecliptic. With an apparent visual magnitude of +5.33, it is dimly visible to the naked eye on a dark night. This star is located at a distance of approximately 540 light years from the Sun based on parallax. At that range, the visual magnitude is diminished by an extinction of 0.10 magnitudes due to interstellar dust. It is drifting further away with a radial velocity of +27 km/s.

This is an evolved K-type giant star with a stellar classification of K1 III, having exhausted the supply of hydrogen at its core then cooled and expanded off the main sequence. The star currently has 31 times the girth of the Sun and is spinning slowly with a projected rotational velocity. It is radiating over 300 times the Sun's luminosity from its enlarged photosphere at an effective temperature of 4,340 K. Based on its abundance of iron, the star has a lower abundances of heavier elements than the Sun.

References

K-type giants
Cancer (constellation)
Cancri, Pi2
Durchmusterung objects
Cancri, 82
079554
045410
3669